Henry Dering may refer to:

Sir Henry Dering, 9th Baronet (1839 – 1906), British ambassador to Mexico and Brazil
Sir Henry Edward Dering, 10th Baronet (1866 – 1931), of the Dering baronets

See also
Dering (surname)